Angelina Daniel Tsere (born 23 August 1999) is a Tanzanian long-distance runner. She competed in the senior women's race at the 2019 IAAF World Cross Country Championships held in Aarhus, Denmark. She finished in 78th place.

In 2017, she competed in the senior women's race at the 2017 IAAF World Cross Country Championships held in Kampala, Uganda. She finished in 37th place.

References

External links 
 

Living people
1999 births
Place of birth missing (living people)
Tanzanian female long-distance runners
Tanzanian female cross country runners
20th-century Tanzanian women
21st-century Tanzanian women